is a compilation album by the Japanese idol group Cute, released on November 18, 2009.

The album debuted at number 17 in the Oricon Weekly Albums Chart, remaining in the chart for 2 weeks.

Track listing

Charts

References

External links 
  
  

Cute (Japanese idol group) compilation albums
2009 greatest hits albums
Zetima compilation albums